The following outline is provided as an overview of and topical guide to Wallis and Futuna:

Wallis and Futuna – French island territory in Polynesia (but not part of, or even contiguous with, French Polynesia) in the South Pacific Ocean between Fiji and Samoa.  It comprises three main volcanic tropical islands and a number of tiny islets. The territory is split into two island groups lying about 260 km apart:

Wallis Islands (Uvea), in the north
Wallis Island (Uvea)
Hoorn Islands (Futuna Islands), in the south
Futuna
Alofi

Since 2003 Wallis and Futuna has been a French overseas collectivity (collectivité d'outre-mer, or COM).

General reference 

 Pronunciation:
 Common English country name:  Wallis and Futuna or the Wallis and Futuna Islands
 Official English country name:  The French Overseas Collectivity of the Wallis and Futuna Islands
 Common endonym(s):  
 Official endonym(s):  
 Adjectival(s): Wallisian, Futunan
 Demonym(s): Wallisian, Futunan
 Etymology: 
 ISO country codes:  WF, WLF, 876
 ISO region codes:  See ISO 3166-2:WF
 Internet country code top-level domain:  .wf

Geography of Wallis and Futuna 

Geography of Wallis and Futuna
 Wallis and Futuna is: A French overseas collectivity
 Location:
 Southern Hemisphere and Eastern Hemisphere
 Pacific Ocean
 South Pacific Ocean
 Oceania
 Polynesia
 Time zone:  UTC+12
 Extreme points of Wallis and Futuna
 High:  Mont Puke on Futuna 
 Low:  South Pacific Ocean 0 m
 Land boundaries:  none
 Coastline:  South Pacific Ocean 129 km
 Population of Wallis and Futuna: 15,000
 Area of Wallis and Futuna: 264
 Atlas of Wallis and Futuna

Environment of Wallis and Futuna 

 Climate of Wallis and Futuna
Birds of Wallis and Futuna
Mammals of Wallis and Futuna

Natural geographic features of Wallis and Futuna 

Rivers of Wallis and Futuna

Regions of Wallis and Futuna

Ecoregions of Wallis and Futuna

Administrative divisions of Wallis and Futuna 

Administrative divisions of Wallis and Futuna

Provinces of Wallis and Futuna

Districts of Wallis and Futuna

Municipalities of Wallis and Futuna 

 Capital of Wallis and Futuna: Mata-Utu
 Cities of Wallis and Futuna

Demography of Wallis and Futuna 

Demographics of Wallis and Futuna

Government and politics of Wallis and Futuna 

Politics of Wallis and Futuna
 Form of government: parliamentary representative democratic French overseas collectivity
 Capital of Wallis and Futuna: Mata-Utu
 Elections in Wallis and Futuna
 Political parties in Wallis and Futuna

Branches of the government of Wallis and Futuna 

Government of Wallis and Futuna

Executive branch of the government of Wallis and Futuna

Legislative branch of the government of Wallis and Futuna 

 Parliament of Wallis and Futuna

Judicial branch of the government of Wallis and Futuna

Foreign relations of Wallis and Futuna

International organization membership 
The Territory of Wallis and Futuna is a member of:
Pacific Islands Forum (PIF) (observer)
The Pacific Community (SPC)
Universal Postal Union (UPU)
World Federation of Trade Unions (WFTU)

History of Wallis and Futuna 

History of Wallis and Futuna

Culture of Wallis and Futuna 

Culture of Wallis and Futuna
 Dance of Wallis and Futuna
 Languages of Wallis and Futuna
 Coat of arms of Wallis and Futuna
 Flag of Wallis and Futuna
 National anthem of Wallis and Futuna
 Public holidays in Wallis and Futuna

Sports in Wallis and Futuna 

Sports in Wallis and Futuna
 Football in Wallis and Futuna

Economy and infrastructure of Wallis and Futuna 

Economy of Wallis and Futuna
 Economic rank, by nominal GDP (2007):
 Communications in Wallis and Futuna
Currency of Wallis and Futuna: Franc
ISO 4217: XPF
 Transport in Wallis and Futuna
Airports in Wallis and Futuna

Education in Wallis and Futuna 

Education in Wallis and Futuna

See also 

Wallis and Futuna

List of international rankings
List of Wallis and Futuna-related topics
Outline of France
Outline of geography
Outline of Oceania

References

External links 

 Official website of the Assembly 
 Official website of the French Administrateur supérieur de Wallis et Futuna 
 
 Map of Wallis and Futuna, with district boundaries
 Information about Wallis and Futuna
 Pictures of Wallis

Wallis and Futuna
 1